Tiago Alves Fraga (born 2 March 1981 in Anápolis, Brazil), sometimes known as just Tiago is a Brazilian professional footballer who plays as attacking midfielder for CRAC.

Career
On 13 July 2009 Tiago signed a two-year deal with Iran Pro League side Persepolis, along with fellow Brazilian Wésley Brasilia. He became a regular player at the end of the season and even scored the first goal in the final of Hazfi Cup.

Club Career statistics
Last Update: 3 May 2016 

 Assist Goals

Honours
Hazfi Cup
Winner: 2
2009/10 with Persepolis
2010/11 with Persepolis

References

Sportspeople from Goiás
1981 births
Brazilian footballers
Goiás Esporte Clube players
Figueirense FC players
Paulista Futebol Clube players
Persepolis F.C. players
Brazilian expatriate footballers
Expatriate footballers in Iran
Living people
Associação Naval 1º de Maio players
Mixto Esporte Clube players
PAS Hamedan F.C. players
São José Esporte Clube players
Clube Recreativo e Atlético Catalano players
Association football midfielders